The cycling at the 2006 Commonwealth Games was made up of three disciplines:
Track cycling
Road cycling
Mountain biking

The track cycling was held at the Melbourne Park Multi-Purpose Venue. The (road cycling) time trial took place on a course on the St Kilda Foreshore and Beach Road, and the State Mountain Bike Course, Lysterfield Park hosted the mountain bike event.
The road race was contested on a circuit through the Royal Botanic Gardens.

Medal summary

Medal table

Road

Mountain bike

Track

External links
 Official 2006 Commonwealth Games Track Cycling page (Archive)
 Official 2006 Commonwealth Games Road Cycling page (Archive)
 Official 2006 Commonwealth Games Mountain Biking page (Archive)

 
2006 Commonwealth Games events
2006
Commonwealth Games
Cycle racing in Australia
2006 in road cycling
2006 in track cycling
2006 in mountain biking